The Hellenic Initiative (THI) is a global humanitarian aid and economic development nonprofit organization that was established in 2012. THI provides crisis relief and economic development through programs in Greece. Mobilizing the Greek Diaspora and Philhellene community to support sustainable economic recovery and renewal for Greece and its people, THI is a Greek Diaspora effort to create jobs in Greece.

THI carries out direct philanthropy and economic revitalization in Greece.  THI’s endeavors proceed on three tracks:

 Crisis relief – supporting high-impact non-profit organizations that are providing a critical safety net to families affected by the economic crisis.
 Entrepreneurship - building a new generation of business and civic leaders and helping them nurture good ideas into viable businesses and social ventures.
 Economic development – mobilizing investment capital to get Greece's economy moving again while charting a path to long-term prosperity.

References 

Greek diaspora
2012 establishments